The 3rd World Science Fiction Convention (Worldcon), also known as Denvention I, was held on 4–6 July 1941 at the Shirley-Savoy Hotel in Denver, Colorado, United States.

Guest of Honor 

 Robert A. Heinlein, who gave a speech entitled "The Discovery of the Future"

Participants 
The convention was chaired by Olon F. Wiggins.

Attendance was 90.

This was the last Worldcon before a five-year break in the annual tradition due to World War II. The next one was held in 1946.

Venue 
The Shirley-Savoy Hotel. Savoy Hotel opened in 1904; Shirley Hotel opened in 1903; Hotels joined in 1919; Hotels razed in 1970.

See also 

 Hugo Award
 Science fiction
 Speculative fiction
 World Science Fiction Society
 Worldcon

References

External links 

 World Science Fiction Society

1941 conferences
1941 in Colorado
1941 in the United States
July 1941 events
Science fiction conventions in the United States
Worldcon